Benjamin Tasker Sr. ( – June 19, 1768) was the 21st Proprietary Governor of Maryland from 1752 to 1753.
He also occupied a number of other significant colonial offices, including, on various occasions, being elected Mayor of Annapolis.

Career
Benjamin Tasker was born around 1690 in Calvert County, Maryland to Rebecca Isaacs (née Brooke) and Thomas Tasker. Tasker became a naval officer at Annapolis, Maryland, in 1719 and served until 1742. He also served in the municipal and provincial government as: member and president of the Governor's Council, 1722–1768; member of the Lower House of the Maryland Legislature, 1715–1717, 1720–1722; member of the Upper House, 1722–1766, 1768; President of the Upper House, 1734–1766, 1768; Annapolis alderman, 1720, 1754–1766; Mayor of Annapolis, 1721–1722, 1726–1727, 1747–1748, 1750–1753, 1756–1757; President of the Council in 1752; acting governor of Maryland, 1753.

In October 1731, Tasker was one of the founders of the Baltimore Ironworks Company.

In 1740, Governor Samuel Ogle was dispatched to England following England's declaration of war against Spain. He left Tasker with his power of attorney and in addition "the task of supervising the construction of a new house at Belair."

Family

Tasker married Ann Bladen, daughter of William Bladen Attorney-General of Maryland, in on July 31, 1711. They had ten children:
William Tasker (1713-1715)
Bladen Tasker (1719-1721)
 Benjamin Tasker Jr. (1720–1760), Mayor of Annapolis and slave trader.
Bladen Tasker (1722-1723).
 Anne Tasker (1728–1817), married the much older Gov. Samuel Ogle (1694–1752).  
 Rebecca Tasker (1724–1797) married Daniel Dulany the Younger  in 1749.
 Elizabeth Tasker (1726–1789) married Christopher Lowndes (1713–1785), merchant  of Bladensburg, Maryland and slave trading partner of Benjamin Tasker Jr. in 1747.
Bladen Tasker (1730-1731).
 Frances Ann Tasker (1738–1787), married the wealthy planter Robert Carter (of Nominy, Westmoreland County, Virginia) at the age of sixteen, in 1754.

Death and legacy
Tasker died on June 19, 1768 in Annapolis. He was buried in St. Anne's Churchyard in Annapolis. His tombstone reads:

Legacy

Benjamin Tasker Middle School, in Bowie, Maryland, is named after him.

See also
Belair Mansion (Bowie, Maryland)

References
Johnston, James H., From Slave Ship to Harvard: Yarrow Mamout and the History of an African Family (May 2012) Retrieved August 2012.
Warfield, J. D. The Founders of Anne Arundel and Howard Counties, Maryland: A Genealogical and Biographical Review from Wills, Deeds and Church Records Retrieved August 2012

Notes

1690 births
1768 deaths
People from Calvert County, Maryland
Colonial Governors of Maryland
Mayors of Annapolis, Maryland
Colonial politicians from Maryland
Tasker family